Ravage (Dr. Geoffrey Crawford) is a fictional character appearing in American comic books published by Marvel Comics. He is also one of the Hulk's enemies.

Fictional character biography
Dr. Geoffrey Crawford was a professor at Desert State University who took undergraduate Bruce Banner under his wing to mentor him. Years later, Banner went to see his teacher and aid him in finding a cure for the Hulk. At this time, Crawford is paraplegic, but nevertheless able to create a machine that could filter out the gamma radiation from Bruce's body. He saw this as a way to regain his walking ability. By obtaining some samples of the Hulk's DNA, he knew it would allow him to use these recuperative powers on himself. First, Crawford reconfigured his own DNA so that it can match with Banner's. This turned him into a stronger beast similar to the Hulk: the monster called Ravage.

Ravage is more powerful than the Hulk and slightly larger. The key element which makes Ravage such a dangerous enemy is that he still has Dr. Crawford's mind and lust for power. Just after his first transformation, Ravage attacks Hulk, but he soon reverts to Crawford at sunrise, much like Banner initially transformed into the Hulk during nightfall and reverted to Banner at sunrise. Crawford turns Banner over to General Ross for fear of being stopped from becoming Ravage again.

Crawford adjusted his machine so that it will change him into Ravage permanently. He then attacks the university as Ravage and terrorizes those who had pitied him as Crawford. Ravage is only stopped when the Hulk formed an unlikely alliance with General Ross that allows his army to trap the villain in a state of suspended animation.

Powers and abilities
Ravage possesses immense strength, durability, and leaping while maintaining his own intellect. In this form, he was bigger and slightly stronger than the Hulk himself. He have acquired these amazing regenerative capabilities, as well as immunity to all known diseases from Banner. Crawford is highly skilled in the field of physics, even when power hungry.

Other versions
In the Ultimate Marvel universe, although Ravage/Dr. Geoffrey Crawford has never appeared, there are some links of him in other Hulk related characters. The character of Tyrone Cash, a vicious mobster with Hulk abilities is portrayed as a former mentor of Bruce Banner, and once was a frail scientist, Dr. Leonard Williams with MS, (much like Crawford) and the Ultimate Marvel version of Dr. Samuel Sterns is a bitter, old, wheelchair-using man who became a Hulk/Leader-like monster.

In other media
Dr. Geoffrey Crawford/Ravage appears in the 2003 video game adaptation of the 2003 Hulk feature film, voiced by Paul Dobson. Geoffrey Crawford initially appears as Bruce Banner's old mentor. In the game, he finds a cure for the Hulk by using the gamma orb, which draws out the gamma energy that created the Hulk. Then when he discovers the military plans to use it to defeat the Hulk. Crawford tells Banner to get to his lab before the military does. This version of Crawford is similar to the original comic book version in that he needs to use a wheelchair for mobility, but he attempts to regain his health to walk again. However, after Bruce Banner arrives in the lab, it is revealed that Crawford is just using him to get gamma radiation for himself, using it to become Ravage. Over the course of the game, it is revealed that Crawford is working with the Leader, who seeks to use the gamma energy from the orb to create an army of gamma warriors. During his boss fight, Ravage battles the Hulk alone at first until he summons two armed gamma creatures to assist him. After being defeated by the Hulk, he reverts to his human form and apologizes for his actions, realizing that his treachery has given the Leader all he needs to create an army. At the end of the game, Crawford is seen apparently trying to get more gamma radiation to become Ravage again by building a copy of the gamma orb after the original was destroyed by the Hulk. However, it does not work and fails on him.
Ravage appears as an unlockable playable character in Lego Marvel's Avengers.

References

External links
 Ravage at Marvel.com

Comics characters introduced in 1999
Fictional characters with paraplegia
Fictional characters with superhuman durability or invulnerability
Fictional physicists
Fictional professors
Marvel Comics characters with accelerated healing
Marvel Comics characters with superhuman strength
Marvel Comics male supervillains
Marvel Comics mutates
Marvel Comics scientists